HD 4628 (96 G. Piscium) is a main sequence star in the equatorial constellation of Pisces. It has a spectral classification of K2.5 V and an effective temperature of 5,055 K, giving it an orange-red hue with a slightly smaller mass and girth than the Sun. HD 4628 lies at a distance of approximately 24.3 light years from the Sun based on parallax. The apparent magnitude of 5.7 is just sufficient for this star to be viewed with the unaided eye. The star appears to be slightly older than the Sun—approximately 5.4 billion years in age. The surface activity is low and, based upon the detection of UV emission, it may have a relatively cool corona with a temperature of one million K.

The star has a relatively high proper motion of 1.4″ per year and is moving in our general direction with a radial velocity of −10.4 km/s. HD 4628 will make its closest approach to the Sun in about 32,000 years, when it comes within . No definitive companion has yet been found in orbit around this star. In 1958 it was thought to have stellar companion that was also a flare star, but this was subsequently disproved.

References

External links
 SolStation entry
 ARICNS entry

K-type main-sequence stars
HD, 004628
Pisces (constellation)
Durchmusterung objects
Piscium, 96
0033
004628
003765
0222
0025